The non-marine molluscs of Japan are a part of the molluscan fauna of Japan (wildlife of Japan).

A number of species of non-marine molluscs are found in the wild in Japan.

Extinct gastropods in Japan include: Vitrinula chaunax, Vitrinula chichijimana, Vitrinula hahajimana.

Freshwater gastropods 
Pomatiopsidae
 Oncomelania hupensis Gredler, 1881

Thiaridae
 Melanoides tuberculata (O. F. Müller, 1774)

Acroloxidae
 Acroloxus orientalis Kruglov et Starobogatov, 1991

Land gastropods 
Land gastropods in Japan include:

Cyclophoridae
 Cyclophorus herklotsi Martens, 1861

Helicinidae
 Ogasawarana discrepans – endemic

Achatinellidae
 Elasmias kitaiwojimanum – endemic

Enidae
 Boninena callistoderma – endemic
 Boninena hiraseana – endemic
 Boninena ogasawarae – endemic
 Luchuena hachijoensis Kuroda, 1945 – endemic

Vertiginidae
 Hypselostoma insularum Pilsbry, 1908 – Ryukyu Islands

Ariophantidae
 Vitrinula chaunax – extinct
 Vitrinula chichijimana – extinct
 Vitrinula hahajimana – extinct

Camaenidae
 Aegista hiroshifukudai Hirano, Kameda & Chiba, 2015
 Aegista inexpectata – endemic
 Aegista intonsa – endemic
Euhadra amaliae (Kobelt, 1875)
Euhadra awaensis (Pilsbry, 1902)
Euhadra brandtii (Kobelt, 1875)
Euhadra callizona (Crosse, 1871)
Euhadra caspari (Möllendorff, 1884)
Euhadra cecillei (Philippi, 1849)
Euhadra congenita (E. A. Smith, 1878)
Euhadra cyclolabris Möllendorff, 1899
Euhadra dixoni (Pilsbry, 1900)
Euhadra eoa (Crosse, 1868)
Euhadra granulifera (Möllendorff, 1888)
Euhadra herklotsi (Martens, 1861)
Euhadra idzumonis (Pilsbry & Gulick, 1900)
Euhadra kunoensis Kuroda in Masuda & Habe, 1989
Euhadra latispira (Pilsbry & Hirase, 1909)
Euhadra latispira yagurai Kuroda & Habe, 1949 [1]
Euhadra luhuana (G. B. Sowerby I, 1839)
Euhadra moreletiana (Heude, 1882)
Euhadra nachicola Kuroda, 1929
Euhadra nesiotica (Pilsbry, 1902)
† Euhadra pachya (Pilsbry, 1902)
Euhadra peliomphala (L. Pfeiffer, 1850)
Euhadra sadoensis (Pilsbry & Y. Hirase, 1903)
Euhadra sandai (Kobelt, 1879)
Euhadra schmackeri (Möllendorff, 1888)
Euhadra senckenbergiana (Kobelt, 1875)
Euhadra senckenbergiana aomoriensis (Gulick & Pilsbry, 1900)
Euhadra senckenbergiana ibukicola
Euhadra senckenbergiana notoensis
Euhadra senckenbergiana minoensis
Euhadra senckenbergiana senckenbergiana
Euhadra sigeonis Kuroda, 1944
Euhadra subnimbosa (Kobelt, 1894)
† Euhadra takarajimana M. Azuma & Y. Azuma, 1985
Euhadra tokarainsula Minato & Habe, 1982
Euhadra yakushimana (Pilsbry & Hirase, 1903)

Diapheridae
 Sinoennea Kobelt, 1904

Bivalvia

Hothouse aliens 
"Hothouse aliens" in Japan include:

See also
Lists of molluscs of surrounding countries:
 List of non-marine molluscs of Russia, Wildlife of Russia
 List of non-marine molluscs of North Korea, Wildlife of North Korea
 List of non-marine molluscs of South Korea, Wildlife of South Korea
 List of non-marine molluscs of China, Wildlife of China

References

 01
Molluscs
Japan
Japan